Windhagen is a municipality in the district of Neuwied, in Rhineland-Palatinate, Germany.

Windhagen consists of the following villages:

References

Neuwied (district)